Cycas fairylakea is a species of cycad endemic to China. There are only two subpopulations left in eastern Guangdong province, China.

Cycas fairylakea can be considered as a subspecies of Cycas szechuanensis.

References

fairylakea
Taxobox binomials not recognized by IUCN